Roland "Buddy" Lewis (born April 14, 1963) is an American comedian, actor, writer and voice-over artist.

Background
Lewis was born in Gary, Indiana, and known from birth as "Buddy".  He graduated from Howard University and moved to Los Angeles to pursue a career in entertainment.

Recent film credits include Black Dynamite, The Chosen One, Robosapien: Rebooted, and The Group. Buddy Lewis recently appeared as himself on the stand-up comedy series, "Martin Lawrence's 1st Amendment" and on the sit-down comedy series "Comics Unleashed" hosted by Byron Allen.

His writing credits include host writer for D.L. Hughley and Jamie Foxx, script writer or staff writing on multiple television programs, and freelance script writer for "Tyler Perry's House of Payne".

In 2017, he co-created a TV series White Famous.

He is a former member of the improvisational group The Comedy Act Players.  He is also a member of Omega Psi Phi fraternity (Alpha chapter).

Buddy Lewis is an avid golfer and self-proclaimed "World's Greatest Comic Golfer". He developed and produced a vlog series "Buddy Lewis, The World's Greatest Comic Golfer". The series features golf matches with his celebrity comedian contenders-friends, comedic commentary, and his topical observations.

Personal life
He has a daughter named Asha who runs a successful blog on Tumblr.

Awards

NAACP Theatre Awards: Best Supporting Actor for The Fabric of a Man (written by David E. Talbert) (2003)
NAACP Theatre Awards: Best Supporting Actor for Pearl (written by Debbie Allen) (2004)

Filmography
 Robosapien: Rebooted (2009)
 Black Dynamite (2009)
 The Chosen One (2009)
 Group Sex (2009)
 Man of Her Dreams (2008)
 Pathology (2008)
 Big Stan (2007)
 Halloween House Party (2005)
 House Party 4 (2004)
 Love Chronicles (2003)
 The Brothers (2001)
 Retiring Tatiana (2000)
 Beverly Hood (1999)
 Woo (1998)

Television

Acting
 Reno 911  (2006)
 That's So Raven  (2006)
 Suite Life of Zack and Cody (2005)
 The Parkers (2003)
 Yes, Dear (2003)
 Boston Legal (2001)
 In The House (1996)
 Martin (1994–1996)

Stand-up/self
 Martin Lawrence Presents: 1st Amendment (2009)
 Comics Unleashed (2009)
 They Don't Die, They Multiply (Story of Robin Harris) (2009)
 Big Whist Comedy Showdown (2008)
 Jamie Foxx's Laffapalooza (2007)
 Celebrity Poker Stars (2007)
 The Wandering Golfer (2006)
 Club Comic View (2006)
 Comic View (2005)
 Def Comedy Jam (2005)

Theater
 Pearl. A play by Debbie Allen is a retelling of the classic fairy-tale Snow White and Seven Dwarfs.,
 The Fabric of a Man
 I Sing 4 Luv
 The Man of Her Dreams
 Greased, Fried, and Laid to the Side
 Love on Layaway
 Men Cry in the Dark

Writing
 1st Amendment Stand Up (2009)
 Jamie Foxx's Writer's Room (2009)
 Compton Christmas Tree (2009)
 BET Awards (2008)
 Essence Awards (2008)
 Tyler Perry's House of Payne (2008)
 Whitebread (2007)
 VH1's Big in '06
 VH1's Big in '05
 The Seat Filler
 Holla (2004)
 12th Annual Espy Awards
 11th Annual Espy Awards
 Vibe Awards
 Vibe (series)

References

External links
 
 

1963 births
Living people
Howard University alumni
Male actors from Indiana
Writers from Gary, Indiana
20th-century American comedians
21st-century American comedians
American stand-up comedians
African-American male comedians
American male comedians
African-American stand-up comedians
American male film actors
American male television actors
American male voice actors
People from Gary, Indiana
20th-century African-American people
21st-century African-American people